Muṣitasmṛtitā (Sanskrit; Tibetan phonetic: jengé) is a Buddhist term that is translated as "forgetfulness". In the Mahayana tradition, muṣitasmṛtitā is defined as forgetting or losing our focus on a virtuous object and instead focusing on an object or situation that causes non-virtuous thoughts or emotions to arise.

Muṣitasmṛtitā is identified as:
 One of the twenty secondary unwholesome factors within the Mahayana Abhidharma teachings

Definitions
Mipham Rinpoche states:
Forgetfullness [muṣitasmṛtitā] is to be unclear and forget a virtuous object. It is the erroneous mindfulness that accompanies a disturbing emotion, and it is the opposite of being mindful. It forms the support for distraction of mind.

The Abhidharma-samuccaya states: 
What is forgetfulness? It is fleeting inspection which is simultaneous with and on the same level as the emotions. It functions as the basis of distraction.

Alexander Berzin explains:
Forgetfulness (brjed-nges). Based on recollection of something toward which we have a disturbing emotion or attitude, forgetfulness is losing our object of focus so that it will wander to that disturbing object. Forgetfulness serves as the basis for mental wandering (rnam-par g.yeng-ba).

See also
 Kleshas (Buddhism)
 Mental factors (Buddhism)

References

Sources
 Berzin, Alexander (2006), Primary Minds and the 51 Mental Factors
 Guenther, Herbert V. &  Leslie S. Kawamura (1975), Mind in Buddhist Psychology: A Translation of Ye-shes rgyal-mtshan's "The Necklace of Clear Understanding" Dharma Publishing. Kindle Edition.
 Kunsang, Erik Pema (translator) (2004). Gateway to Knowledge, Vol. 1. North Atlantic Books.
 Nina van Gorkom (2010), Cetasikas, London: Zolag

Unwholesome factors in Buddhism
Sanskrit words and phrases